Christine Müllner (born 10 March 1975) is a former synchronized swimmer from Austria. 

References 

1975 births
Living people
Austrian synchronized swimmers
Olympic synchronized swimmers of Austria
Synchronized swimmers at the 1992 Summer Olympics